The oblique arytenoid, the more superficial arytenoid muscle, forms two fasciculi, which pass from the base of one cartilage to the apex of the opposite one, and therefore cross each other like the limbs of the letter X; a few fibers are continued around the lateral margin of the cartilage, and are prolonged into the aryepiglottic fold; they are sometimes described as a separate muscle, the Aryepiglotticus.

The aryepiglottic muscle together with the transverse arytenoid and the thyroarytenoid work as a sphincter and close the larynx as we swallow or cough. Its innervation is by the recurrent laryngeal nerve (from vagus) just like all the intrinsic muscles of the larynx except the cricothyroid muscle.

References

External links
 

Muscles of the head and neck